Lava domes are common features on volcanoes around the world. Lava domes are known to exist on plate margins as well as in intra-arc hotspots, and on heights above 6000 m and in the sea floor. Individual lava domes and volcanoes featuring lava domes are listed below.

Africa

Ethiopia
Borawli, Afar Region

Asia

Afghanistan

Armenia
Geghama mountains

Indonesia
Wayang-Windu, Java
Ranakah, Flores

Japan

Mount Keigetsu
Mount Hokuchin
Mount Hakuun
Mount Ryōun
Mount Kuro
Shikaribetsu Volcanic Group
Mount Tarumae, Hokkaidō
Mount Yoko
Shinmoedake

Philippines
Musuan Peak, Mindanao, Bukidnon

Russia
Diky Greben
Barkhatnaya Sopka
Astrid Island

Turkey
Göllü Dağ

Europe

France

Mont Gerbier de Jonc, Ardèche
Puy-de-Dôme, Clermont-Ferrand

Greece
Gyali, Dodecanese
Methana Volcano

Iceland 
 Torfajökull

Italy 
Monte Amiata, Tuscany

United Kingdom
 Glynn Hill, County Antrim, Northern Ireland
 Scafell Dacite (including Great Gable), Cumbria, England
 Skerry Fell Fad, Argyll and Bute, Scotland

North America

Canada

Grenada
Mount Saint Catherine

Mexico
Popocatepetl, Mexico
El Chichon, Chiapas, Mexico

United States

Augustine Volcano, Cook Inlet, Alaska
Lassen Peak, Shasta County, California
Mono-Inyo Craters, California
Panum Crater, California
Newberry Volcano, Oregon
West Crater, Washington
Novarupta, Alaska
Black Butte, Siskiyou County
Chaos Crags
Coso Volcanic Field
Mammoth Mountain, Inyo National Forest
Sutter Buttes, Sacramento Valley
Big Southern Butte, Butte County, Idaho
Cinnamon Butte, Oregon
Marble Mountain-Trout Creek Hill, Washington
Mount Elden, Coconino County, Arizona
Kendrick Peak, Coconino County, Arizona near Flagstaff, Arizona
Steamboat Springs, Washoe County, Nevada
Salton Buttes, Salton Sea, California

South America

Argentina

Bolivia
Cerro Chascon-Runtu Jarita complex
Nuevo Mundo volcano

Chile

Oceania

New Zealand

Ben Lomond, North Island
Mount Tarawera, North Island
Māngere Mountain, North Island

Australia
Prospect Hill, New South Wales

Extraterrestrial lava domes

Mons Rümker, near side of the moon

See also
List of stratovolcanoes
List of shield volcanoes
List of cinder cones

References